Abū al-ʿAlāʾ al-Maʿarrī (full name  , also known under his Latin name Abulola Moarrensis; December 973 – May 1057) was an Arabic philosopher, poet, and writer. Despite holding a controversially irreligious worldview, he is regarded as one of the greatest classical Arabic poets.

Born in the city of al-Ma'arra (present-day Ma'arrat al-Nu'man, Syria) during the later Abbasid era, he became blind at a young age from smallpox but nonetheless studied in nearby Aleppo, then in Tripoli and Antioch. Producing popular poems in Baghdad, he refused to sell his texts. In 1010, he returned to Syria after his mother began declining in health, and continued writing which gained him local respect.

Described as a "pessimistic freethinker", al-Ma'arri was a controversial rationalist of his time, citing reason as the chief source of truth and divine revelation. He was pessimistic about life, describing himself as "a double prisoner" of blindness and isolation. He attacked religious dogmas and practices, was equally critical and sarcastic about Judaism, Christianity, Islam and Zoroastrianism, and became a deist. He advocated social justice and lived a secluded, ascetic lifestyle. He was a vegan, known in his time as moral vegetarian, entreating: "do not desire as food the flesh of slaughtered animals / Or the white milk of mothers who intended its pure draught for their young". Al-Ma'arri held an antinatalist outlook, in line with his general pessimism, suggesting that children should not be born to spare them of the pains and suffering of life.

Al-Ma'arri wrote three main works that were popular in his time: The Tinder Spark, Unnecessary Necessity, and The Epistle of Forgiveness. Al-Ma'arri never married and died at the age of 83 in the city where he was born, Ma'arrat al-Nu'man. In 2013, a statue of al-Ma'arri located in his Syrian hometown was beheaded by jihadists from the al-Nusra Front.

Life
Abu al-'Ala' was born in December 973 in al-Ma'arra (present-day Ma'arrat al-Nu'man, Syria), southwest of Aleppo, whence his nisba ("al-Ma'arri"). At his time, the city was part of the Abbasid Caliphate, the third Islamic caliphate, during the Islamic Golden Age. He was a member of the Banu Sulayman, a notable family of Ma'arra, belonging to the larger Tanukh tribe. One of his ancestors was probably the first qadi of Ma'arra. The Tanukh tribe had formed part of the aristocracy in Syria for hundreds of years and some members of the Banu Sulayman had also been noted as good poets.

He lost his eyesight at the age of four due to smallpox. Later in his life he regarded himself as "a double prisoner", which referred to both this blindness and the general isolation that he felt during his life.

He started his career as a poet at an early age, at about 11 or 12 years old. He was educated at first in Ma'arra and Aleppo, later also in Antioch and other Syrian cities. Among his teachers in Aleppo were companions from the circle of Ibn Khalawayh. This grammarian and Islamic scholar had died in 980 CE, when al-Ma'arri was still a child. Al-Ma'arri nevertheless laments the loss of Ibn Khalawayh in strong terms in a poem of his Risālat al-ghufrān. Al-Qifti reports that when on his way to Tripoli, al-Ma'arri visited a Christian monastery near Latakia where he listened to debates about Hellenistic philosophy, which planted in him the seeds of his later scepticism and irreligiosity; but other historians such as Ibn al-Adim deny that he had been exposed to any theology other than Islamic doctrine.

In 1004–05 al-Ma'arri learned that his father had died and, in reaction, wrote an elegy where he praised his father. Years later he would travel to Baghdad where he became well received in the literary salons of the time, though he was a controversial figure. After the eighteen months in Baghdad, al-Ma'arri returned home for unknown reasons. He may have returned because his mother was ill, or he may have run out of money in Baghdad, as he refused to sell his works. He returned to his native town of Ma'arra in about 1010 and learned that his mother had died before his arrival.

He remained in Ma'arra for the rest of his life, where he opted for an ascetic lifestyle, refusing to sell his poems, living in seclusion and observing a strict moral vegetarian diet. His personal confinement to his house was only broken one time when violence had struck his town. In that incident, al-Ma'arri went to Aleppo to intercede with its Mirdasid emir, Salih ibn Mirdas, to release his brother Abuʿl-Majd and several other Muslim notables from Ma'arra who were held responsible for destroying a winehouse whose Christian owner was accused of molesting a Muslim woman. Though he was confined, he lived out his later years continuing his work and collaborating with others. He enjoyed great respect and attracted many students locally, as well as actively holding correspondence with scholars abroad. Despite his intentions of living a secluded lifestyle, in his seventies, he became rich and was the most revered person in his area. Al-Ma'arri never married and died in May 1057 in his home town.

Philosophy

Opposition to religion
Al-Ma'arri was a skeptic who denounced superstition and dogmatism in religion. This, along with his general negative view on life, has made him described as a pessimistic freethinker. One of the recurring themes of his philosophy was the right of reason against the claims of custom, tradition, and authority. Al-Ma'arri taught that religion was a "fable invented by the ancients", worthless except for those who exploit the credulous masses.

Al-Ma'arri criticized many of the dogmas of Islam, such as the Hajj, which he called "a pagan's journey". He rejected claims of any divine revelation and his creed was that of a philosopher and ascetic, for whom reason provides a moral guide, and virtue is its own reward.

His religious scepticism and positively antireligious views extended beyond Islam and included both Judaism and Christianity, as well. Al-Ma'arri remarked that monks in their cloisters or devotees in their mosques were blindly following the beliefs of their locality: if they were born among Magians or Sabians they would have become Magians or Sabians. Encapsulating his view on organized religion, he once stated: "The inhabitants of the earth are of two sorts: those with brains, but no religion, and those with religion, but no brains."

Asceticism
Al-Ma'arri was an ascetic, renouncing worldly desires and living secluded from others while producing his works. He opposed all forms of violence. In Baghdad, while being well received, he decided not to sell his texts, which made it difficult for him to live. This ascetic lifestyle has been compared to similar thought in India during his time.

Unjust exploitation of animals
In al-Ma'arri's later years he chose to stop consuming meat and all other animal products (i.e., he became a practicing vegan). He wrote:

Antinatalism 
Al-Ma'arri's fundamental pessimism is expressed in his antinatalist recommendation that no children should be begotten, so as to spare them the pains of life. In an elegy composed by him over the loss of a relative, he combines his grief with observations on the ephemerality of this life:

Al-Ma'arri's self-composed epitaph, on his tomb, states (in regard to life and being born): "This is my father's crime against me, which I myself committed against none."

Modern views
Al-Ma'arri is controversial even today as he was skeptical of Islam, the dominant religion of the Arab world. In 2013, almost a thousand years after his death, the al-Nusra Front, a branch of al-Qaeda, beheaded a statue of al-Ma'arri during the Syrian civil war. The statue had been crafted by the sculptor Fathi Muhammad. The motive behind the beheading is disputed; theories range from the fact that he was a heretic to the fact that he is believed by some to be related to the Assad family.

Despite the controversy surrounding him, al-Ma'arri is sometimes referred to as one of the greatest classical Arab poets. Some have drawn connections between him and the Roman poet Lucretius, calling them progressive for their time.

Works 

An early collection of his poems appeared as The Tinder Spark (Saqṭ al-zand). The collection of poems included praise of notable people of Aleppo and the Hamdanid ruler Sa'd al-Dawla. It gained great popularity and established his reputation as a poet. A few poems in the collection were about armour.

A second, more original collection appeared under the title Unnecessary Necessity (Luzūm mā lam yalzam ), or simply Necessities (Luzūmīyāt ). The title refers to how al-Ma'arri saw the business of living and alludes to the unnecessary complexity of the rhyme scheme used.

His third famous work is a work of prose known as The Epistle of Forgiveness (Resalat Al-Ghufran ).
The work was written as a direct response to the Arabic poet Ibn al-Qarih, whom al-Ma'arri mocks for his religious views. In this work, the poet visits paradise and meets the Arab poets of the pagan period. This view is shared by Islamic scholars, who often argued that pre-Islamic Arabs are indeed capable of entering paradise.

Because of the aspect of conversing with the deceased in paradise, the Resalat Al-Ghufran has been compared to the Divine Comedy of Dante which came hundreds of years after. The work has also been noted to be similar to Ibn Shuhayd's Risala al-tawabi' wa al-zawabi, though there is no evidence that al-Ma'arri was inspired by Ibn Shahayd nor is there any evidence that Dante was inspired by al-Ma'arri. Algeria reportedly banned The Epistle of Forgiveness from the International Book Fair held in Algiers in 2007.

Paragraphs and Periods (Al-Fuṣūl wa al-ghāyāt) is a collection of homilies. The work has also been called a parody of the Quran.

Al-Ma'arri also composed a significant corpus of verse riddles.

Editions
 Risalat ul Ghufran, a Divine Comedy. Translated by G. Brackenbury 1943.
 The Epistle of Forgiveness: Volume One: A Vision of Heaven and Hell. Translated by Geert Jan Van Gelder and Gregor Schoeler. Library of Arabic Literature, New York University Press 2013.
 The Epistle of Forgiveness: Volume Two: Hypocrites, Heretics, and Other Sinners. Translated by Geert Jan Van Gelder and Gregor Schoeler. Library of Arabic Literature, New York University Press 2014.
 Those riddles of al-Maʿarrī that are cited in al-Ḥaẓīrī's twelfth-century Kitāb al-Iʿjāz fī l-aḥājī wa-l-alghāz have been edited as Abū l-ʿAlāˀ al-Maʿarrī, Dīwān al-alġāz, riwāyat Abī l-Maʿālī al-Ḥaẓīrī, ed. by Maḥmūd ʿAbdarraḥīm Ṣāliḥ (Riyadh [1990]).

See also 
Abbasid Caliphate
Arabic literature
Indian philosophy
Islamic Golden Age
List of vegans

References

Sources
P. Smoor, "Al-Ma'arri" in: H. A. R. Gibb (ed.), The Encyclopaedia of Islam, Volume 3, Part 1, Brill, 1984, 927–935.
 Islam, a Way of Life by Philip Khuri Hitti
 Medieval Islamic Civilization by Josef W. Meri, Jere L. Bacharach
 The Cambridge History of Arabic Literature by A F L Beeston
 A Literary History of the Arabs by Reynold Alleyne Nicholson
 The Cambridge History of Islam by P. M. Holt, Ann K. S. Lambton, Bernard Lewis
 New Encyclopedia of Islam by Cyril Glasse, Huston Smith
 A History of Islamic Spain by William Montgomery Watt, Pierre Cachia
 Arabic Historical Thought in the Classical Period by Tarif Khalidi
 A Literary History of Persia by Edward Granville Browne
  A Call for Heresy by Anouar Majid
 The Production of the Muslim Woman by Lamia Ben Youssef Zayzafoon

External links 

 
 
The Epistle of Forgiveness: A Vision of Heaven and Hell (Volume One), Abū Al ʿAlāʾ Al Maʿarrī
Abu 'l-ʿAla Al-Ma'arri's correspondence on vegetarianism, Journal of the Royal Asiatic Society, 1902, p. 289, by D. S. Margoliouth
 37 of Al-Ma'arri's poems, in English, posted by Humanistictexts.org
 The Luzumiyat

973 births
1057 deaths
10th-century Arabic poets
11th-century Arabic poets
Anti-natalists
Ascetics
Blind poets
Blind writers
Critics of Christianity
Critics of Judaism
Deist philosophers
Former Muslim critics of Islam
Syrian former Muslims
Syrian atheists
Freethought
Hermits
Mirdasid emirate of Aleppo
Philosophers from the Abbasid Caliphate
People from Aleppo
People from Maarat al-Numan
People from the Hamdanid emirate of Aleppo
Philosophers of pessimism
Poets from the Abbasid Caliphate
Rationalists
Religious skeptics
Tanukhids
Veganism activists